This article lists notable examples of media projects, including films, music, and video games, that were or have been in development for at least ten years after their first public announcement before release without being officially cancelled, a state known as "development hell", or, in the software industry, vaporware.

Films
 Akira: Warner Bros. acquired the rights to make a live-action American adaptation of the anime film and its manga of the same name in 2002, and have made a number of attempts to film it. Directors attached to the project since 2002 have included James Cameron, Stephen Norrington, Ruairí Robinson, the Hughes brothers, George Miller, Christopher Nolan, and Jaume Collet-Serra. It was announced in 2019 that filming would be done later that year, in a production produced by Andrew Lazar and Leonardo DiCaprio and directed by Taika Waititi. However, in August of that year, Waititi began work on the Marvel Studios film Thor: Love and Thunder, which once again put filming plans on hold.
 Alien vs. Predator:  Alien vs. Predator was first planned shortly after the 1990 release of Predator 2, to be released sometime in 1993. It was halted for more than a decade, with constant actor changes, restarts, and failed promotions of the film until it was finally released in 2004.
 Alita: Battle Angel: James Cameron's live-action adaptation of Yukito Kishiro's manga series Battle Angel Alita was in development hell starting in the early 2000s. The project was finally completed under the direction of Robert Rodriguez and released in 2019.
 Atlas Shrugged: Film and later television adaptations of Ayn Rand's novel were in development hell for nearly 40 years before the novel was finally brought to screen in the first part of a trilogy in 2011. Part II appeared in 2012, and Part III was released in September 2014, but with three different actresses playing female lead character Dagny Taggert in each part.
 Atuk: A film adaptation of the novel The Incomparable Atuk. Norman Jewison first purchased the film rights in 1971, and since then there have been several attempts to produce it. One Hollywood legend holds that the project is cursed because of the premature deaths of various actors who expressed an interest in the lead role: John Belushi, Sam Kinison, John Candy, Phil Hartman and Chris Farley.
 Avatar sequels: These films were first announced in 2010, aiming for a release of the second installment by 2014. The timeline has been pushed back a total of 8 times, due to director James Cameron being occupied with other projects, the VFX team working on creating underwater motion capture, and the COVID-19 pandemic affecting production. However, the first sequel of the film, Avatar: The Way of Water, released on December 16, 2022, almost a decade after initial development began.
 Bajirao Mastani: The film was conceived in the 1990s and was finally announced in 2003 but was shelved indefinitely owing to its ever-changing cast. The film was finally revived in 2014 and went immediately in production and was released in December 2015.
 Beetlejuice 2: In 1990, Tim Burton commissioned a sequel to Beetlejuice called Beetlejuice Goes Hawaiian, written by Jonathan Gems. After multiple studio rewrites, in 1997 Gems stated that the film will never be made. In 2011, Warner Bros. hired Seth Grahame-Smith to write and produce a sequel. In  2013, Winona Ryder expressed her interest in the sequel saying, "I'm kind of sworn to secrecy but it sounds like it might be happening. It's 27 years later." In January 2015, writer Grahame-Smith said the script was finished and that he and Burton intended to start filming by the end of the year, and that both Keaton and Ryder would return in their respective roles. In April 2019, Warner Bros. stated the sequel had been shelved; however, in February 2022, a sequel was announced, produced by Plan B Entertainment with Warner Bros. Pictures. Brad Pitt will serve as a producer, while Keaton and Ryder will reprise their respective roles. Principal photography is intended to begin in the summer of that year.
 Bill & Ted Face the Music: An attempt to revive Bill & Ted came to fruition in August 2010 when franchise star Keanu Reeves indicated that a script for a third film was being worked on despite the fact that the character Rufus would not return, because the character's original actor, George Carlin, had died two years prior. Dean Parisot was attached to direct by August 2012. In March 2013 at the SXSW Film Festival, Alex Winter confirmed progress on the film was still being made. In April 2016, Winter told Forbes that they had a script, a director, and a studio, and that they were planning to film by early 2017. Reeves gave an update on the film in February 2017 during an interview on The Graham Norton Show, saying the story was written, and discussing the plot of the film: "Basically, they're supposed to write a song to save the world, and they haven't done that. The pressure of having to save the world, their marriages are falling apart, their kids are kind of mad at them, and then someone comes from the future and tells them if they don't write the song it's just not the world, it's the universe. So they have to save the universe because time is breaking apart". During the New York City Comic Convention, Reeves revealed that the title will be Bill & Ted Face the Music. The film was released on August 28, 2020.
 The Black Cauldron: Walt Disney Productions optioned Lloyd Alexander's five-volume book series in 1971 and acquired the right of Lloyd Alexander's novel The Chronicles of Prydain and started development of the movie in 1973. The release date was delayed several times. In July 1978, the studio pushed the release date to Christmas 1984 due to their inability to animate realistic human characters, which caused The Fox and the Hound to be released in 1981.  Re-production of the Black Cauldron began in 1980. Shortly before the film's initially planned 1984 theatrical release, a test screening for the rough cut of the film was held at the studio, but was met with negative feedback claiming that it was too intense and disturbing for the majority of the children in the audience, particularly during the climatic Cauldron Born sequence. The newly appointed Disney studio chairman Jeffrey Katzenberg ordered certain scenes to be removed to calm things down. When producer Joe Hale objected Katzenberg's demands, Katzenberg responded by taking the film and editing it himself. After Michael Eisner heard from Hale what Katzenberg was doing, he called him in the edit room and convinced him to stop. Though he did what Eisner told him, he requested that the movie should be modified and delayed from Christmas 1984 to July 24, 1985, so that the movie could be reworked. After 14 years of development, the movie was released on July 24, 1985, receiving mixed reviews from critics and becoming a box-office bomb.
 Blair Witch 3: A third film in the Blair Witch franchise was in talks since the October 2000 release of Book of Shadows: Blair Witch 2. Despite rumors, development did not begin until September 2009 when creators Daniel Myrick and Eduardo Sánchez announced a third film in the works from Lionsgate, retconning any events from Book of Shadows. After several scripts be tossed around, Simon Barrett's script was pitched with Adam Wingard announced as director in 2013 under its working title, The Woods. The film—simply under its name, Blair Witch—was released on September 16, 2016 with polarizing reactions from critics and audiences, and was a disappointment at the box office.
 Bone: A film adaptation of the 1991 comic of the same name was in development since the late 90s with one attempt being under Paramount under the Nickelodeon Movies banner, A later attempt was under Warner Bros. in 2008 with another later attempt in 2016 with Warner Bros. Feature Animation. An animated series by Netflix Animation was announced in 2019 but was later cancelled in April 2022.
 A Confederacy of Dunces: The Pulitzer Prize winning novel has had a motion picture adaptation announced at least seven times, with some of the attempts even making it to a full script being written and most of the major characters of the novel cast, only to always stall and be abandoned.
 Dallas Buyers Club: The screenplay was written in September 1992 by Craig Borten. Throughout the 1990s, he wrote 10 different scripts, hoping for it to be picked up. It was unable to secure financial backing, going through three different directors, finally being released in 2013, with Jean-Marc Vallée directing.
 The Dark Tower: An adaptation of The Dark Tower had been in development since at least 2007.  The film was eventually released on August 4, 2017.
 Deadpool: Deadpool was in development hell for more than 15 years. In May 2000, Artisan Entertainment announced a deal with Marvel Entertainment to coproduce, finance and distribute a film based on American comic books publisher Marvel Comics character Deadpool. In February 2004, New Line Cinema attempted to produce a Deadpool film with writer/director David S. Goyer working on the spin-off and actor Ryan Reynolds in the title role; Reynolds himself became interested in the character after finding out that in Cable & Deadpool, Deadpool refers to his own scarred appearance as "Ryan Reynolds crossed with a Shar Pei". By August, Goyer lost interest in favor of other projects. In March 2005, after New Line put Deadpool in turnaround, 20th Century Fox became interested in moving forward on production for the project. Fox considered a Deadpool spin-off early in the development of X-Men Origins: Wolverine, which had Reynolds cast in the role, and after the opening weekend success of that film announced that it was lending Deadpool out to writers, with Lauren Shuler Donner acting as a producer. Donner wanted the film to reboot the character of Deadpool, ignoring the version in X-Men Origins: Wolverine and including attributes that the character has in the comics, such as breaking the fourth wall. Rhett Reese and Paul Wernick were hired to write the script in January 2010, and Robert Rodriguez was sent an early draft of the screenplay that June. After negotiations with Rodriguez fell through, Adam Berg emerged as a top contender to direct. In April 2011, visual effects specialist Tim Miller was hired as director, making the film his directorial debut. In September 2014, Fox gave the film a release date of February 12, 2016. The film was released on that date to positive reviews and became the ninth highest-grossing film of 2016 worldwide, as well as the highest-grossing R-rated film of all time, until it was surpassed by its own sequel, Deadpool 2, which itself was later surpassed by the film Joker.
 Death Note: This 2017 neo-noir supernatural teen horror film, loosely based on the Japanese manga and anime of the same names respectively, was in development since August 2007. The American production company Vertigo Entertainment was originally set to develop the remake, with Charley and Vlas Parlapanides as screenwriters and Roy Lee, Doug Davison, Dan Lin, and Brian Witten as producers. On April 30, 2009, Variety reported that Warner Bros., the distributors for the original Japanese live-action films, had acquired the rights for an American remake, with the original screenwriters and producers still attached. In 2009, Zac Efron responded to rumors that he would be playing the film's lead role by stating that the project was "not on the front burner".  On January 13, 2011, it was announced that Shane Black had been hired to direct the film, with the script being written by Anthony Bagarozzi and Charles Mondry. Warner's studios planned to change the background story of Light Yagami into one of vengeance instead of justice and to remove Shinigami from the story. Black opposed this change, and it had not been green-lit. Black confirmed in a 2013 interview with Bleeding Cool that he was still working on the film. In July 2014, it was rumored that Gus Van Sant would replace Black as the film's new director, with Dan Lin, Doug Davison, Roy Lee and Brian Witten producing through Vertigo Entertainment, Witten Pictures and Lin Pictures. The film was eventually directed by Adam Wingard and was distributed by Netflix for an August 2017 release and received mostly negative reviews.
 Die Hard 4: A fourth installment in the Die Hard franchise was in the works since 1998 with David Marconi, screenwriter of the film Enemy of the State, penning under its working title, WW3.com and using John Carlin's Wired magazine article entitled "A Farewell to Arms", Marconi crafted a screenplay about a cyber-terrorist attack on the United States. After the September 11, 2001 attacks, the project was stalled, only to be resurrected several years later and rewritten into Live Free or Die Hard by Doug Richardson and eventually by Mark Bomback. Willis said in 2005 that the film would be called Die Hard 4.0, as it revolves around computers and cyber-terrorism. IGN later reported the film was to be called Die Hard: Reset instead. 20th Century Fox later announced the title as Live Free or Die Hard and set a release date of June 29, 2007 with filming to begin in September 2006. The film was the only film in the franchise to receive a PG-13 rating. It was a moderate box office hit, but as with the first three films, it received positive reviews from critics and audiences.
 Dinosaur: The film was pitched back in 1988 by Phil Tippett as a stop motion animated film then in 1994 was changed to a CGI animated film after seeing Jurassic Park. The film also had problems with the story, Having many drafts written and even with the final draft a lot of cuts to the film had to be made. The film was in development for 12 years until its final release in 2000.
 Evangelion: 3.0+1.0 Thrice Upon a Time: The fourth and final installment of in the Rebuild of Evangelion tetralogy, based on the anime series Neon Genesis Evangelion, was announced alongside Evangelion: 3.0 You Can (Not) Redo as the final part of the Rebuild tetralogy under its working title Evangelion: Final, as double feature for release in 2008. Originally scheduled for a release in 2020, it was removed due to concerns over the COVID-19 pandemic thus later being rescheduled for January 23, 2021 until January 14, 2021, when the film was removed from the release calendar again. The film was finally released in Japan on March 8, 2021, to favorable reviews.
 The Family Guy Movie: A theatrical film based on the hit Fox series Family Guy was announced since July 2007, over two years after the series was revived from cancellation, but series creator Seth MacFarlane declared it as "nothing official" at that time. In TV Week on July 18, 2008, MacFarlane confirmed plans to produce a theatrically released Family Guy feature film sometime "within the next year." He came up with an idea for the story, "something that you could not do on the show, which [to him] is the only reason to do a movie." He later went on to say he imagines the film to be "an old-style musical with dialogue" similar to The Sound of Music, saying that he would "really be trying to capture, musically, that feel." On October 13, 2011, MacFarlane confirmed that a deal for a Family Guy film had been made, and that it would be written by himself and series co-producer Ricky Blitt. On November 30, 2012, MacFarlane confirmed plans to produce a Family Guy film. The project was put on hold while MacFarlane worked on Ted 2. On August 10, 2018, Fox announced that a live-action/animated film based on the series is in development. In July 2019, MacFarlane confirmed that there will be a Family Guy movie, though the acquisition of 21st Century Fox by Disney has made the timeline for the film's development and release unclear.
 Foodfight!: In 2004, the CGI film Foodfight was announced. Described as "Toy Story in a supermarket", the film promised to bring together over 80 famous advertising characters with voice talent including Charlie Sheen, Christopher Lloyd, Eva Longoria, Hilary and Haylie Duff, and Wayne Brady. Director Lawrence Kasanoff expected it to be a commercial hit and merchandise for the movie appeared on store shelves before the film had a release date. However, the film ran into many problems. In late 2002/early 2003, Kasanoff reported that hard drives containing unfinished assets from the film had been stolen in what he called an act of "industrial espionage". After several years, a trailer was finally shown at AHM in 2011, a company bought the DVD distribution rights for the film in Europe, and a quiet video-on-demand American release came in 2012.
Freddy vs. Jason: A crossover between Freddy Krueger and Jason Voorhees was first attempted in 1987, but fell apart due to disagreements between Paramount Pictures and New Line Cinema, the respective owners of Friday the 13th and A Nightmare on Elm Street. After the release of Jason Goes to Hell: The Final Friday, which teased Freddy vs. Jason, New Line Cinema spent roughly $6 million on several unused scripts from over a dozen screenwriters, but eventually, Mark Swift and Damian Shannon produced a script that went into production. The film experienced controversy when it was announced Kane Hodder, the longtime actor for Jason, was to be replaced by a different actor, and experienced further controversy when it was revealed that the original 120-page script was to be cut down by a different writer. Both Swift and Shannon had to deal with studio interference and hesitation, as well as fighting a PG-13 rating and having to send out a questionnaire to gauge interest in the concept. Finally, the film released on August 15, 2003, and grossed $116.6 million worldwide on a production budget of $30 million to a mild critical response.
Hellraiser: A remake of the original 1987 film was first announced by Clive Barker in October 2006 in which he stated he was writing the script and it was going to be produced by Dimension Films. He also announced that Pascal Laugier was set to direct, but he was later taken off the project due to creative differences. Then in October 2010, Patrick Lussier and Todd Farmer were announced to be writing and directing the film, but in 2011 they said they were also taken off the project despite drafting multiple scripts with different ideas. Two years later in October 2013, Clive Barker announced he was to head a Hellraiser reboot starring Doug Bradley in his ninth film as Pinhead but he announced in 2017 on Twitter that the script had been sent to Dimension Films years ago with no correspondence since. Finally, Spyglass Media Group and David S. Goyer were confirmed to be working on a Hellraiser remake in May 2019, and in 2020 David Bruckner, Ben Collins and Luke Piotrowski were also confirmed to be directing and writing the script. In October 2021, principal filming finally wrapped up; it was revealed that Jamie Clayton was to be playing Pinhead and the film was coming out on Hulu.
 The Incredible Mr. Limpet: Development for a remake of the 1964 film of the same name started in 1996 with Jim Carrey in the lead role and Steve Oedekerk as director. By March 1999, Oedekerk left the project following creative differences, while Carrey followed suit in July the same year. In April 2000, Mike Judge was also set to direct with filming set to begin in February 2001. In June 2009, Kevin Lima was attached to direct. In 2010, it was reported that Zach Galifianakis was in talks for the lead role. In March 2011, Richard Linklater entered negotiations to helm the project, and was announced as the director in January 2014. That same month, Femke Wolting and Tommy Pallotta had begun working on the design and animation on the project while Galifianakis would reportedly play the lead character. On July 8, 2014, it was announced that Jon Hamm, Danny McBride, Sarah Silverman, Kevin Hart, Josh Gad, Keegan-Michael Key, and Jordan Peele had entered talks for various roles in the film. On August 4, Linklater left the project to concentrate on his next film That's What I'm Talking About (released in 2016 as Everybody Wants Some!!).
 ID Forever Part I and II: The sequels to Independence Day were in development hell from 1997 until 2009, when director Roland Emmerich announced the pre-production of the films, which were planned to be shot back-to-back. However, ID Forever Part I was renamed to Independence Day: Resurgence for its release on June 24, 2016.
 The Irishman: The film had been in development since 2007. It went on to have its world premiere at the 57th New York Film Festival on September 27, 2019, and received a limited theatrical release on November 1, 2019, followed by digital streaming on November 27, 2019, by Netflix.
 Jurassic World: The fourth film of the Jurassic Park series was in development hell ever since the release of Jurassic Park III in 2001 when it was first announced. After scheduling and release conflicts, the fourth film was eventually retooled as a soft reboot known as Jurassic World, which was released theatrically on June 12, 2015.
 Live 2 Tell: A film based on the rapper Tupac Shakur's screenplay that he had written during his incarceration in 1995, about a drug dealer's tale of redemption. The project goes back to 2005, where IMDB listed it as currently in-production pending further development. No information was published until 2011 when a company named NStar Studios picked up the project and planned to put it into production in 2012. With an estimated budget of $11 million, a crowdfunding campaign was started to raise $250,000 in 30 days, but it failed and NStar was never able to get the project off the ground. As of 2021, the film is still listed on IMDB with no further information available.
 Mad Max: Fury Road: In 1995, George Miller re-acquired the rights to future Mad Max films from Warner Bros. The idea for a fourth  occurred to Miller in August 1998 when he was walking in an intersection in Los Angeles. About a year later, while travelling from Los Angeles to Australia, the idea coalesced. Miller conceived a story where "violent marauders were fighting, not for oil or for material goods, but for human beings." The film was set to shoot in 2001 through 20th Century Fox, but was postponed because of the September 11 attacks that same year. "The American dollar collapsed against the Australian dollar, and our budget ballooned", Miller said, adding that he "had to move on to Happy Feet because there was a small window when that was ready". Mel Gibson, who starred in the original three previous films, would not return to his role as the lead character. Miller ended up re-casting the role because of controversies surrounding Gibson and because he wanted Max to remain at a younger age, as the "same contemporary warrior". Miller announced in 2003 that a script had been written for a fourth film, and that pre-production was in the early stages. The project was given the green light to begin filming in the Australian desert in May 2003 with a budget of US$100 million, but the location was ruined by rainfall. Mad Max 4 then entered a hiatus in light of security concerns related to its Namibian shoot because of tightened travel and shipping restrictions at the onset of the Iraq War. In 2007, after focusing on the animated musical comedy Happy Feet, Miller decided to pursue the project again. He briefly considered producing Fury Road as a computer-animated film but abandoned it in favor of live-action. In 2009, Miller announced that filming would begin in early 2011. Tom Hardy was cast as the title character in June 2010, with production planned to begin that November. Principal photography was delayed several more times before beginning in July 2012. The film wrapped in December 2012, although additional footage was shot in November 2013. The film was finally released on May 15, 2015 to critical acclaim, although after the release of the film in question, there has been an ongoing pay dispute between Warner Bros. and Miller as to producing future sequels.
 The Man Who Killed Don Quixote: A loose adaptation of the Don Quixote tale co-written and directed by Terry Gilliam. Production originally started in 1998, but during shooting in 2000, a significant number of difficulties such as the set and equipment being destroyed by flooding, the departure of the film's lead owing to illness, problems obtaining insurance for the production, and other financial difficulties led to a sudden suspension of the production and its subsequent cancellation. Part of the development hell is shown in documentary Lost in La Mancha. Gilliam made several additional attempts to revive the project until filming finally completed in 2017 and the finished film was released the following year.
 Pinocchio: A darker stop-motion animated adaption of the Italian novel The Adventures of Pinocchio was conceived by Guillermo del Toro in 2008. On February 17, 2011, it was announced that Gris Grimly and Mark Gustafson would co-direct the film written by del Toro and Matthew Robbins. On May 17, 2012, del Toro took over for Grimly. The movie was initially scheduled to be released in 2014, but the project was in development hell and no further informations were made for years since that. In January 2017, Patrick McHale was announced to co-write the script. On August 31, 2017, del Toro told that the film need a budget increase of $35 million. In November 2017, del Toro reported that the project was cancelled, because no studios were willing to finance it. However, on October 22, 2018, it was announced that the film had been revived by Netflix. The film was finally released in December 2022 to critical acclaim.
 The Postman: Author David Brin described the ten-year effort to get his novel produced as a film. Production began in 1987, but the final film was not released until 1997. In the process, the screenplay went through so many revisions that the shooting script only loosely resembled the book, and writers later "borrowed" elements from the book to improve the film. The film was a box-office bomb and was negatively reviewed.

 Sangam (Hindi for "Union") is an Indian film that was in development hell for at least 15 years. It was originally developed under the original title Gharoanda (Hindi for "nest", literally "house of twigs"), but was withheld by company R.K. Films for a couple of reasons. Then, in 1963, it was remade as Sangam and starred Raj Kapoor, Vyjayanthimala, and Rajendra Kumar, among others. It was released in 1964 with a duration of about 4 hours, being the first Hindi film with two intervals. It was a box office success.
 The Simpsons Movie: The idea for a film adaptation was considered back in 1992 in the early years of the series, but did not materialize due to the lack of experience on making a theatrical film. The film took around 15 years to be released in 2007.
 Sin City: A Dame to Kill For: A sequel to the 2005 film Sin City was announced shortly after that film was released. Director Robert Rodriguez and creator Frank Miller planned for the film to be based on A Dame to Kill For, with the latter stating that it would be a prequel and a sequel, and that the script would be done by 2006 and production would begin later that same year. However, Rodriguez had also said that official casting would not start until the script was finalized and in the studio's hands. In March 2012, Rodriguez announced that production on Sin City 2 would begin in mid-2012. He also mentioned that the cast would be "of the same caliber and eclecticism" as that of the previous film. It was also announced the film would be released in 3D. On April 13, 2012, production of the film was confirmed, in addition to a new title, Sin City: A Dame to Kill For. The film was expected to go into production in the summer of 2012, but principal photography began near the end of October 2012. On June 17, 2013, the film's release date was pushed back from October 4, 2013, to August 22, 2014. Rodriguez later explained that the film was always intended for release in 2014 and that they were merely holding the October date for Machete Kills. Unlike its predecessor, the film was a critical and commercial failure, but would gain a cult following on its home and digital release later on.
 Sonic the Hedgehog: The film based on Sega's own flagship video game character was in development hell as early as 1994, when studios such as Metro-Goldwyn-Mayer and DreamWorks dropped the script for a Sonic film. It was only in 2013 that Sony Pictures announced that its Columbia Pictures brand and Original Film acquired the rights to the video game series and the film would be a joint venture with Sega's owned Marza Animation Planet and Blur Studio. In October 2017, Paramount Pictures announced that they had acquired the rights after Sony's Columbia Pictures put the film into turnaround. In February 2018, it was announced that the film would be released on November 15, 2019. However, after negative reactions from the first trailer, the studio changed its official theatrical release date to February 14, 2020, for more retooling by Moving Picture Company. The film was a box office success and received favorable reviews from critics. 
 Space Jam: A New Legacy: A sequel to the 1996 live-action/animated hybrid Space Jam was in the works in 1997, with Joe Pytka from the first film to direct, Bob Camp to design an all-new character, Berserk-O! and his henchmen, and Spike Brandt and Tony Cervone signing on as the animation supervisors. The potential sequel reentered development as Spy Jam and was to star Jackie Chan in a different script. The studio was also planning a film titled Race Jam, which would have starred Jeff Gordon. Additionally, Pytka revealed that following the first film's success, he had been pitched a story for a sequel that would have starred professional golfer Tiger Woods, with Jordan in a smaller role. Pytka explained how the idea came from an out of studio script conference, with people who worked on the original film allegedly involved. Another idea for a Space Jam sequel, entitled Skate Jam, was in early development with Tony Hawk in the starring role. Plans were underway for production to begin immediately following the release of Looney Tunes: Back in Action, but it was cancelled given that film's poor box office performance despite otherwise improved critical reception from Space Jam. Over 10 years later however, talks for a sequel were resurrected with LeBron James as the main star. Filming began from June 25 to September 26, 2019, with Malcolm D. Lee helming as director. In addition, in March 2020, photos during the shooting were leaked as Warner Bros. characters outside the Looney Tunes franchise would also appear in the film, such as Superman, Batman, Pennywise, Scooby-Doo and Shaggy, Harry Potter, Joker, Gollum, Bane, Scorpion and Sub-Zero, Agent Smith, Mad Max, Finn and Jake, The Mask, the Gremlins, Tom and Jerry, Austin Powers, King Leonidas, George the Gorilla, Dr. Manhattan, Harold and Kumar, Yakko, Wakko, and Dot, Rick and Morty among others. The film, titled Space Jam: A New Legacy, was released on July 16, 2021, to generally negative reviews.

 Speed Racer: A live-action Speed Racer film was in the works since 1992 when Warner Bros. opted the rights to make a film version of it in conjunction with Silver Pictures. In October 1994, singer Henry Rollins was offered the role of Racer X. In June 1995, Johnny Depp was cast into the lead role for Speed Racer, with production slated to begin the coming October, In September 2000, Warner Bros. and producer Lauren Shuler Donner hired writer-director Hype Williams to take the helm of the project. In June 2004, Vince Vaughn spearheaded a revival of the project by presenting a take for the film that would develop the characters more strongly. Vaughn was cast as Racer X and was also attached to the project as an executive producer. With production never becoming active, Vaughn was eventually detached from the project. However, the Wachowskis were brought on board by the studio to write and direct the film in October 2006. The film was released on May 9, 2008. Although critics gave it mixed reviews and was a box office bomb, it was received positively by fans and garnered a cult following.
 Strange Magic: The idea for this film was in development since 2000 alongside the Star Wars prequels, with it being conceived by George Lucas as "Star Wars for 12-year-old girls" and pitched as a Beauty and the Beast story where the Beast doesn't change. The film would be released in 2015.
 Superman Lives: The name given to a project begun by producer Jon Peters in 1993 as Superman Reborn. The proposed film would have followed the comic story line known as The Death of Superman. Jonathan Lemkin was hired to write the initial script, but Peters brought on a series of additional screenwriters to overhaul the script, including Gregory Poirier in 1995 and Kevin Smith in 1996. Director Tim Burton became attached to the film, with Nicolas Cage cast as the Man of Steel, and several more screenwriters were brought on board for several more rewrites. Burton backed out in late 1998 citing differences with producer Peters and the studios, opting instead to direct Sleepy Hollow. Additional writers and directors were attached to the project at various times over the next few years. Peters' project went through several more permutations before evolving into Superman Returns, released in 2006, 13 years after initial development began. The film's journey through development hell was later explored by a documentary on the topic, The Death of "Superman Lives": What Happened?, released in 2015.
 Terminator 3: Rise of the Machines: A third installment in the Terminator franchise was announced even before Terminator 2: Judgment Day was released. In July 1991, while the sequel was in its theatrical run, Cameron said that if the film was successful then "there may be some economic pressure" to do a sequel. When Carolco Pictures, the production company behind the second film, filed for bankruptcy in 1995, director James Cameron was hired to come back and direct the third film for 20th Century Fox. A year later, when Cameron's 3D film ride, Terminator 2 3-D: Battle Across Time, would open, the project team reunited the main cast of the second film and prompted Cameron to begin writing a script for a Terminator 3 film, despite him being too busy working on Titanic for 20th Century Fox during that time. Eventually, former Carolco founders Mario Kassar and Andrew G. Vajna founded C2 Pictures, and rights for the third film were backed by German and Japanese investors by 1999. Jonathan Mostow was set to direct, and Arnold Schwarzenegger returned by 2000, despite his focus on the 2002 California gubernatorial elections two years later during filming. The film was released on July 2, 2003, and was met with mixed reception with critics, fans, and the general public, but nevertheless was a box office success.
 The Thief and the Cobbler: Originally conceptualized in 1963, the film was released in 1993.
 Tomb Raider: A film reboot of the franchise of the same name was announced by producer Graham King and studios Metro-Goldwyn-Mayer and Warner Bros. back in 2009. Stars like Olivia Wilde, Kristen Stewart and Megan Fox were originally slated to audition the role as Lara Croft. It was announced in 2015 during the release of 20th Century Fox's Hitman: Agent 47 that Adrian Askarieh, producer of the Hitman films, stated that he hoped to oversee a shared universe of Square Enix-based films, with Just Cause, Hitman, Tomb Raider, Deus Ex, and Thief, but admitted that he does not have the rights to Tomb Raider. In May 2017, the Game Central reporters at Metro UK suggested that the shared universe was unlikely, pointing out that no progress had been made on any Just Cause, Deus Ex nor Thief films. Deadline Hollywood had previously reported that Daisy Ridley was considered for the role, though she later stated in an interview with Vogue that it was just the "craziest rumor" she had ever heard about herself. Eventually, the role was given to Alicia Vikander as the titular character and the film was released on March 16, 2018, with mixed reception from critics. A sequel, with MGM being the sole distributor, was scheduled to be released on March 19, 2021 until September, when it was delayed to an unknown release date due to the COVID-19 pandemic, before being cancelled in 2022 after MGM's film rights to the Tomb Raider series expired.
Tom & Jerry: Plans for a theatrical Tom and Jerry movie were drawn up in 2009 as a live-action computer-animated film following the success of Alvin and the Chipmunks. 6 years later, Warner Bros. wanted to place a renewed focus on animation, and plans changed from a full-on live-action film to a full-on animated film. 3 years later, plans have officially been finalized as a live-action/animated hybrid that began to film in 2019, originally planned to be released on April 16, 2021, before being pushed back for a December 23, 2020 release. The film was officially released on March 5, 2021.
 Treasure Planet: A animated outer space adaptation of Treasure Island described as "Treasure Island in space" was pitched as far back as 1985 with constant rejection from then-Disney CEO Michael Eisner and then-chief of Walt Disney Studios Jeffrey Katzenberg until 1997; after the release of Hercules, the film was greenlit for release in 2002. The film was a box office bomb and received mixed-to-positive reviews from critics.
 Uncharted: A film based on Naughty Dog's Uncharted games was in development since 2008 when film producer Avi Arad stated that he was working with a division of Sony to develop a film adaptation of Uncharted. Principal photography began on March 16, 2020, with Ruben Fleischer directing, but was shut down in mid-March 2020 due to the COVID-19 pandemic. Production resumed on July 20, and filming concluded on October 29, 2020. Owing to the COVID-19 pandemic, the film's release date was delayed to October 8, 2021. The film was moved up to July 16, 2021, taking the original release date of Spider-Man: No Way Home, before releasing on February 11, 2022.
 Warcraft:  A live-action adaptation of the Warcraft series was first announced in 2006. The film spent several years in development hell before the project advanced. It was scheduled for a 2016 release. The film was released in June 2016 worldwide with a Paris premiere in May.
 Watchmen: The 2009 film based on the Alan Moore graphic novel from DC Comics had undergone much various production problems, such as penning the script from four different studios and directors and attaching different screenwriters for the project. Development was halted for twenty years until 2006, when Zack Snyder, fresh out of production of the then-soon-to-be-released 300, was hired as director for the film. It was eventually released on March 6, 2009, with mixed reactions from critics and moderate success worldwide at the box office, but received more acclaim from fans gaining more of a cult following over the years.
 Where the Wild Things Are: A film adaptation of the Maurice Sendak children's book of the same name that was in development since 1983, being tossed around to various studios, starting at Disney as a traditionally hand-drawn animated adaptation directed by John Lasseter in 1988. In 2001, plans for a CGI adaptation of the film produced under Universal Pictures and directed by Eric Goldberg were reverted to live-action and later produced under Warner Bros. in 2009.

Music
 Chinese Democracy: Rock band Guns N' Roses began work on this album in the late 1990s. In the time between its conception and release, nearly the entire lineup of the band had changed numerous times. It was once dubbed "The Most Expensive Album Never Made" by The New York Times. Recorded in 14 separate studios with reported production costs of $13 million, Chinese Democracy was eventually released in November 2008.
 Closure/Continuation: The eleventh studio album by British progressive rock band Porcupine Tree is their first since 2009's The Incident. Despite public uncertainty of the band's future after frontman Steven Wilson's focus on a solo career in 2010, the album was recorded intermittently in complete secrecy among Wilson, Gavin Harrison, and Richard Barbieri across the course of the following decade, without long-time bassist Colin Edwin. With the COVID-19 pandemic putting members' separate plans on hold, the band found time to completely finish the album in September 2021. Towards the end of the year, the band's reformation was publicly announced, alongside the album's release date of 24 June 2022.
 Detox: A studio album by American hip hop recording artist Dr. Dre, slated to be his swan song album, was originally slated for release between 2011 and 2012 through Aftermath Entertainment and Interscope Records. Production for Detox began in 2000, but has been delayed several times as Dr. Dre wanted to concentrate on producing for artists that were on his Aftermath record label. Work for the upcoming album dates back to 2001, where its first version was called "the most advanced rap album ever," by co-producer Scott Storch. Even at the beginning of Detoxs production, it was announced that it would be Dr. Dre's final studio album, which had been confirmed at different points throughout the album's 10-year production process. Because Dr. Dre had stated he was tired of rapping about marijuana use and a stereotypical gangster lifestyle, he planned to make Detox a hip-hop musical telling the story of a professional hitman and his family, with an intended summer 2003 release date. Initially announced in 2000 after the release of Dr. Dre's previous album 2001 (1999), Detox went through many iterations during its 11-year production period, failing to have a confirmed release date due to Dr. Dre believing the project "wasn't good enough". However, the album spawned two official singles, "Kush" and "I Need a Doctor". In January 2004, Storch listed guest appearances such as 50 Cent, Eminem, Game, and Snoop Dogg. Keri Hilson told Rap-Up that she had recorded material for the album but was unsure if the tracks would make the final cut. J. Cole stated that he recorded with Dre but refused to explain further. The album's production was eventually cancelled on August 1, 2015, with Dr. Dre instead releasing a brand-new album, Compton, inspired by the concurrent production of the film Straight Outta Compton, a week later on August 7.Fear Inoculum: Tool frontman Maynard James Keenan announced at the 50th Grammy Awards in February 2008 that the band would start working on a follow up to their 2006 album 10,000 Days "right away". However, a number of creative, personal, and legal issues delayed the writing and recording of the album, which was eventually released at the end of August 2019.i/o: The hypothetical tenth studio album from British art pop musician Peter Gabriel, i/o began production in April 1995 following the conclusion of Gabriel's Secret World tour, concurrently with his seventh studio album, Up (itself not released until 2002).— Peter Gabriel: Had a Nice Decade by Franklin Cumberbatch, 27 September 2002. VH1  Gabriel originally stated that the album would be released in 2004, only for extensive touring in support of Up to delay these plans considerably. Gabriel repeatedly gave vague updates on the album's production over the following years, first stating in 2008 that he was "shifting focus" towards both i/o and his cover album Scratch My Back (which saw release in 2010) before later claiming in 2011 that i/o was still just a number of unfinished "song ideas" that he had yet to elaborate upon. Gabriel would continue to post about the album's production during the remainder of the 2010s, ultimately stating on BBC Radio in April 2019 that he was planning on finishing songwriting for i/o by the end of the year. Despite his plans to "get a record out" by early 2020, the album was delayed further as a result of lockdowns imposed in the wake of the COVID-19 pandemic. In an interview with Uncut magazine for their September 2020 issue, Gabriel stated that despite the delays, "I have enough songs to make a record I'm proud of," and that a complete album could be expected at an indeterminate point in the future. The album's lead single, "Panopticom", was eventually released on January 6, 2023, with plans to release additional singles with each successive full moon that year; no release date has been given for the full album.
 Look Outside Your Window: An unreleased studio album recorded by four members of the American band Slipknot. The material was written and recorded concurrently with the sessions for the band's fourth studio album All Hope Is Gone (2008). However, its emphasis on experimentation and a more melodic rock style kept it classified as a separate body of work from Slipknot's aggressive heavy metal sound. The album was scheduled for release during the latter half of the band's We Are Not Your Kind touring cycle, which was postponed due to the COVID-19 pandemic. After a few years of uncertainty, on January 2, 2023, percussionist Shawn Crahan spoke about the possibility of the album being released later this year.
 The Smile Sessions:  Archival recordings of the Beach Boys' unfinished album Smile took nearly 45 years to compile for a dedicated release. Numerous complications contributed to its excessively protracted delay, including bandleader Brian Wilson's irrational fear of the album. Brother and bandmate Carl Wilson compared the album's structuring to editing a film, as compiler Alan Boyd explains, "I think he was right about that. The kind of editing that the project required seemed more like the process of putting a film together than a pop record."
 Starship: A studio album by Italian electronic band Eiffel 65, this would be their fourth album since 2003, and the first one after ending their "Bloom 06 project" in 2010. Members Gianfranco Randone and Maurizio Lobina reunited that same year with Gabry Ponte, who had left the band in 2005 to "reunite once again to produce new music as well as touring". In an April 2012 interview, Jeffrey Jey commented that "within the next two or three months" they would release "some" songs online. Four years after, on June 1, 2016, they released "Panico/Critical", their first single in twelve years. They have toured Europe with their "New Planet Tour" since 2010, mainly in Italy, and occasionally in other European countries, as well as in Australia in 2012. As of 2021, the band is semi-active; Gabry Ponte has stated that he does not participate in record production and concerts, but he has never officially left the group either. In 2020, Italian rapper Shiva released a single called "Auto Blu ft. Eiffel 65", which is a remake of Blue (Da Ba Dee) with different lyrics. Some unreleased Eiffel 65 songs have been leaked, but the album remains unreleased almost ten years after its announcement, five years after their last original single was released, and eighteen years after their last studio album was released, with no further details or release date set for their new album, if ever.Still Sucks: This is the sixth album from American nu metal band Limp Bizkit, to be released a decade after the band's fifth album Gold Cobra was released in 2011. Production began when they left Interscope and signed up with Cash Money Records in February 2012, with attempts to release a new album under its initial name Stampede of the Disco Elephants. The first single "Lightz (City of Angels)" was released on October 26, 2012. After many delays, the second single for the album, "Ready to Go", featuring label mate Lil Wayne was released on April 16, 2013, to positive reviews. The band officially left their previous label Cash Money Records on October 26, 2014. In February 2016, Metal Injection reported that the band was still in the studio recording the new album. The album remained unreleased, with no release date set for several years. Guitarist Wes Borland has already completed writing and performing guitars for the record, but stated in late 2017 that frontman Fred Durst is still working on his parts. Borland again reiterated the band's progress in November 2018. In July 2017, Durst claimed on Instagram that the album had already been available online for a year and a half on Soulseek, but Borland refuted this saying he "doesn't know what [Durst] is talking about." In August 2021, the band announced they would begin releasing songs in close succession, leading up to the album's release, before announcing the album title as Still Sucks and the release date. The album was released on October 31, 2021, to positive reviews. None of the previously released singles were included on the album.
 United World Rebellion: This is a trilogy of two extended plays and one upcoming studio album from the American heavy metal band Skid Row that was meant to last a year or two, but ended up being a decade because of the studio album's delays. United World Rebellion: Chapter One was released on April 16, 2013, and is the band's first EP since 1995. The recording was released by Megaforce Records and sold 1,500 copies in its first week in the US. "Kings of Demolition" was released as a single and features a music video. "This Is Killing Me" was released as the second single and also features a music video. Rise of the Damnation Army – United World Rebellion: Chapter Two was released on August 5, 2014, by Megaforce, and sold 1,300 copies in the US in its first week. "We Are the Damned" was released as a single and features a music video. United World Rebellion: Chapter Three, originally scheduled for release in 2015 but pushed back to 2016 following Solinger's departure from the band and then pushed back again due to Tony Harnell's sudden departure. When released it is expected to feature new lead singer ZP Theart. Originally planned to be the third EP which will complete the United World Rebellion album, the band has now stated in an interview that chapter 3 will be a full-length studio album. According to guitarist Dave "Snake" Sabo, it was expected to be released on September 16, 2022. The third chapter was ultimately scrapped with the band's next record having the title The Gang's All Here instead, and Erik Grönwall as lead vocalist instead of Theart.
 Untitled Minecraft album: C418, who was originally the sole producer of Minecraft's original soundtrack, has been planning to release a third soundtrack album as a follow-up to 2011's Minecraft - Volume Alpha and 2013's Minecraft - Volume Beta. However, the third album has been delayed indefinitely from its original 2017 release window, and its fate remains uncertain as C418 officially resigned from working on Minecraft in late 2021; the game's version 1.13 update in 2018 contains the only new music that's been contributed to the game itself by C418 since the release of Volume Beta.
 Untitled X Japan album: The upcoming sixth studio album by Japanese heavy metal band X Japan was initially planned to be half new songs and half re-recordings of old songs; this was abandoned at some point in its 10 years of production in favour of all-new material. Several different release dates were announced in that time, but the album remains unpublished despite drummer and bandleader Yoshiki confirming its completion in September 2018. However, several songs reported to be on it have been made commercially available digitally. If released, it will be X Japan's first album of new material in two and a half decades, their first since reuniting in 2007, and their first to feature newest member Sugizo.
 Wildflower: The second studio album by Australian electronic music group the Avalanches. After the release of their debut Since I Left You, the group toured for three years and collaborated with various musicians, such as Luke Steele in 2003. The first song made after the debut was Saturday Night Inside Out. These sessions would produce early versions of songs which made the final cut, such as Colours. During this time, member Robbie Chater was ill for three years with two autoimmune diseases, leaving him unable to produce music and further delaying the project. The group attempted several projects, including collaborations with Ariel Pink, Jennifer Herrema, and Danny Brown (the origin of Frankie Sinatra), and a psychedelic hip-hop animated feature film of Yellow Submarine (the origin of The Noisy Eater). By 2014, all members had left except Chater and Tony Di Blasi, and the record label Modular had announced that "Album sounds awesome, but there's no dates or anything planned. The official line is 'stay tuned.'". Wildflower was released in July 2016 and features remnants from these projects, with re-edits, rewrites and production lasting from 2000 until 2016.

Video games
 Aliens: Colonial Marines: First announced in 2001, Aliens: Colonial Marines spent over 12 years in development hell. The original game, which was announced in 2001 to be in development by Check Six Games, was cancelled. The video game rights for the Alien franchise were sold in December 2006 to Sega. Gearbox Software subsequently announced that it would take over development of Colonial Marines, intending it to be a direct follow-up to Aliens. The game would spend another 7 years in development, during which Gearbox's resources were also being consumed by other projects, such as Duke Nukem Forever, as well as its own franchise Borderlands, resulting in much of the game's development being outsourced to other studios. The game was released in 2013, where it was criticized for having various bugs and gameplay issues, low-quality graphics, as well as a lack of consistent continuity with the Alien film franchise. Further controversy emerged when it was found that Gearbox and Sega had presented demos of the game at conventions that had a noticeably higher graphics quality than the final product.
 Beyond Good and Evil 2: An upcoming sequel to the 2003 video game, Beyond Good & Evil. The original was released in 2003, was critically praised and gained a cult following, but was considered a commercial failure. Its director said in a May 2008 interview with the French magazine  that a Beyond Good & Evil sequel had been in pre-production for a year, but was yet to be approved by Ubisoft. Ubisoft officially announced a sequel in 2016. Ubisoft showed the first new trailer for Beyond Good and Evil 2 during their E3 2017 conference, with it being announced as a prequel to the first game.
 Diablo III: Development began in 2000 by Blizzard North and continued until the studio closed in 2005. An entirely new development began in 2006, and the game was released in 2012.
 Duke Nukem Forever: The sequel to the 1996 game Duke Nukem 3D, Duke Nukem Forever, was in development hell for 14 years: from 1997 to its release date in 2011. The long development time was caused by numerous factors, including a switch from the Quake II engine to the Unreal Engine, having a relatively small development staff by modern standards (3D Realms' co-owners George Broussard and Scott Miller infamously maintained that the game would be released "when it's done"), conflicts between 3D Realms and its publisher, Take-Two Interactive, over how it had been handling the constant delays, and the eventual bankruptcy of 3D Realms. In 2009, the rights to the Duke Nukem franchise were sold to Gearbox Software, who eventually completed the game and released it in 2011.: "Allen Blum and those guys, they're actually now in the Gearbox Software building on the tenth floor. We brought them in; they're now connected to the Gearbox infrastructure and our central team of animators and modelers and sound engineers." The game was ultimately a critical disappointment, with most of the criticism directed towards the game's clunky controls, long loading times, offensive humor, and overall aged and dated design. The game eventually proved to be profitable, according to a statement by Take-Two during its earnings call in August 2011.
 Final Fantasy XV: Originally titled Final Fantasy Versus XIII, it was announced in 2006 as a spinoff of Final Fantasy XIII exclusively for PlayStation 3. Following a long period with little news on the game, it was re-announced as the next mainline installment of the series on PlayStation 4 and Xbox One which underwent large changes in direction such as making the game a self-contained story and replacing the main heroine. The game was released worldwide on November 29, 2016, more than 10 years after it was initially announced. Additional story content was released post-launch in the form of episodic DLC.
 Half-Life 2: Episode Three: In May 2006, Valve Corporation announced a trilogy of episodic games that would continue the story of Half-Life 2 (2004). Valve president Gabe Newell said the approach would allow Valve to release products more quickly after the six-year Half-Life 2 development, and that he considered the trilogy the equivalent of Half-Life 3. Episode One was released on June 1, 2006, followed by Episode Two on October 10, 2007. Episode Three was initially planned to be released on Christmas 2007. Concept art surfaced in 2008, and reports surfaced that Valve was working with sign language on a deaf character. Valve released little information regarding Episode Three in the following years; though Valve still discussed Half-Life, there was no clarity on whether further games were coming. In March 2010, Newell spoke of "broadening the emotional palette" of the series, and said that the next Half-Life game may return to "genuinely scaring the player". In 2011 he said: "We went through the episodes phase, and now we're going towards shorter and even shorter cycles ... For me, 'entertainment as a service' is a clear distillation of the episodic content model." That year, Wired described Episode Three as vaporware. Valve eventually abandoned episodic development.
 Kirby's Return to Dream Land: Development began in 2000 immediately following the release of Kirby 64: The Crystal Shards, but the game was not revealed to the public until E3 2005, alongside two other game demos which were both eventually cancelled. Due to development issues, as well as being developed late in the GameCube’s lifespan, the project would not officially be shown again until E3 2011, and the game would finally see a release later that year on its successor, the Wii. Some concepts that were scrapped would eventually be revisited in Kirby Star Allies and Kirby and the Forgotten Land, which were released for the Nintendo Switch in 2018 and 2022, respectively.Metroid Dread: Metroid Dread was intended to be a sequel to Metroid Fusion (2002) by Yoshio Sakamoto but was initially stopped by hardware limitations. The first attempt was made in 2005 for the Nintendo DS and first appeared in a 2005 Nintendo internal software list for "key DS games to be announced in the future"; however, by late 2005, many rumours were circulating that the game was in development hell due to the DS's hardware limitations. The second attempt at the game was a playable prototype shown in E3 2009 behind closed doors. The prototype didn't meet Sakamoto's expectations however, so production was halted in 2010. Despite denying Dreads existence since 2010, Nintendo announced that MercurySteam were developing the revived Metroid Dread for the Nintendo Switch with a release date of October 8, 2021. Mewgenics: First announced in 2012 by Team Meat, the game was intended to be the company's follow-up project to the highly successful Super Meat Boy. Originally set for a 2014 release, the game suffered from feature creep and differences in priorities between Team Meat's owners, Edmund McMillen and Tommy Refenes. The game was initially shelved in 2014, but after two years of no development, was cancelled in 2016. After leaving Team Meat, McMillen acquired the rights to Mewgenics in 2018 and rebooted its production with Tyler Glaiel and new gameplay. It is tentatively set to be released in 2024, twelve years after its announcement.
 Mother 3: A sequel to the 1994 Super Famicom RPG Mother 2 (released as EarthBound in 1995 in North America). The game was initially intended to be released on the Super Famicom like its predecessor, starting development shortly after the latter's release, before shifting focus to the Nintendo 64's Disk Drive add-on. Following the failure of the add-on, the media format of the game was shifted to a standard N64 cartridge before the development team's inexperience with 3D-oriented video game creation and a large series of delays led to the game being quietly cancelled in 2000. Eventually, assets from the cancelled project were collected and converted to a 2D format, and the project restarted development on the Game Boy Advance. Twelve years after its conception, Mother 3 was finally released on the Game Boy Advance in 2006, but only in Japan.
 Six Days in Fallujah: The game was originally scheduled for a release in 2010, but development was soon halted due to the insolvency of the developer studio Atomic Games. It was later revealed in 2021 to have restarted development through Highwire Games, with the game currently planned for release in 2023.
 Star Citizen: Development of the game began in 2011, and is being mostly financed from a large crowdfunding campaign. The game was originally planned for a 2014 release, but significant delays in production and expansion of gameplay features meant it had to be delayed indefinitely. Due to mismanagement, some of the early work done for the first-person-shooter module has been scrapped altogether, resulting in wasted financial resources and development time. As of right now, there is no clear release date for the game.StarCraft: Ghost''': StarCraft: Ghost was set to be the first game in a sub-series of games set in the StarCraft universe in the genre of third-person shooters unlike the usual real-time strategy of the series. First announced in September 2002, Blizzard confirmed that the game would be worked on in conjunction with Nihilistic Software for multiple consoles and that the game was aimed for a late 2003 release date however, the game got continuous delays throughout the following months and in 2003, Nihilistic said they were discontinuing their work on the project. Soon after this, Blizzard began collaborating with Swingin' Ape Studios for a September 2005 release date but after the GameCube version was cancelled and the other two console versions were delayed to a year later, Blizzard announced an indefinite postponement of the game in order to explore possibilities of seventh generation video game consoles. Despite sporadic information on the game between 2006 and 2008, Blizzard Entertainment finally officially cancelled StarCraft: Ghost'' in a 2014 interview with Polygon about the similarly cancelled MMO Titan.

See also
Development hell
Turnaround
Vaporware
List of films with longest production time

References

Film production
 
Video game development